Saxifraga squarrosa, the Dolomites saxifrage, is a species of flowering plant belonging to the family Saxifragaceae. It is native to the Eastern Alps.

References

squarrosa
Flora of Italy
Plants described in 1821